Brad Terry (born 1937) is a jazz clarinetist and whistler.

Career
Terry was raised in Stamford, Connecticut. He appeared on the album The Living Room Tapes by Lenny Breau. The album was recorded in 1979 and released posthumously in 2003. He has played with Buck Clayton, Dizzy Gillespie, Roger Kellaway, Red Mitchell,  Steve Swallow, and Buddy Tate and has taught workshops in Poland.

References

 Stuart, Anne, December, 1990, Associated Press, "Hear Their Lips: Dedicated Whistlers Still Give a Hoot", 
 Forbes-Roberts, Ron, 2006, One Long Tune: The Life and Music of Lenny Breau, University of North Texas Press, Denton, p. 209–10, 242-44

1937 births
Living people
21st-century clarinetists
American jazz clarinetists
Whistlers